Mourne may refer to:

In Ireland
Mourne Abbey, a small parish just south of Mallow, County Cork, Ireland
Mourne (barony), in County Down, Northern Ireland
Mourne Mountains, located in County Down in the south-east of Northern Ireland
Mourne Wall, built around the Mourne Mountains in Northern Ireland
River Mourne, a river in County Tyrone, Northern Ireland
Newry and Mourne District Council, in Northern Ireland
Mourne (Northern Ireland Parliament constituency)

Media
The Mourne Observer, a newspaper in County Down, Northern Ireland

Entertainment
 Mourne, a fictional member of the comedy group The Kransky Sisters
"The Mountains of Mourne", an Irish folk song
 The Kingdom of Mourne, a fictional place in the 2011 American fantasy comedy film Your Highness

See also
 Mourning, grief over the death of someone
 "The Moorlough Shore", a song also known as "The Maid of Mourne Shore"